Mojca Dežman (born 14 May 1967) is a Slovenian former alpine skier who competed for Yugoslavia in the 1988 Winter Olympics.

External links
Mojca Dežman's profile at Sports Reference.com
Mojca Dežman's profile at FIS

1967 births
Living people
Slovenian female alpine skiers
Olympic alpine skiers of Yugoslavia
Alpine skiers at the 1988 Winter Olympics
Place of birth missing (living people)